The River Goul is a river that flows through the counties of Tipperary, Kilkenny and Laois in Ireland. It is a tributary of the River Erkina which is in turn a tributary of the River Nore.

It has its source in the Slieveardagh Hills, approximately six kilometres south of Urlingford.  It enters the town from the southeast, passing under Main Street and making its way to the bridge at Urlingford Castle (and Mill). It flows north passing between Johnstown and Galmoy into County Laois before joining the River Erkina several kilometres west of Durrow.

See also
 Rivers of Ireland

References

Footnotes

Sources

Further reading

External links

 

Rivers of County Kilkenny
Rivers of County Tipperary
Rivers of County Laois